Bon Kuh, also rendered as Ponkuh, may refer to:
Bon Kuh-e Olya, a village in Jiroft County, Kerman Province, Iran.
Bon Kuh-e Sofla, a village in Jiroft County, Kerman Province, Iran.
Boneh Kuh, a village in Bandar Lengeh County, Hormozgan Province, Iran.
Bonkuiyeh, a village in Bardsir County, Kerman Province, Iran.